The olive rockfish, Acanthoclinus fuscus, is a longfin of the family Plesiopidae. They are permanent inhabitants of the intertidal zone, which demonstrate homing behaviour, and are found in pools among rocks or boulders. If the conditions in these pools become unsuitable they may leave the pools. Their diet consists mostly of invertebrates, mainly crustaceans and molluscs. They are able to breathe air. This species swims with a sinuous motion similar to an eel. The male guards the eggs. Olive rockfish are black with a distinctive white band on the head.

References

Olive rockfish
Endemic marine fish of New Zealand
Fish described in 1842